The Singles Album (cat no. GRADLSP 3) was released in 1980 and is a compilation LP and the first greatest hits by British reggae band UB40, featuring all of UB40's single releases on Graduate, including the 3-track Dutch 12" single "Tyler".

The album spent 8 weeks on the UK Album Chart, peaking at number 17.

Track listing
Side 1
"Food for Thought"
"King"
"My Way of Thinking"
"I Thing It's Going to Rain Today"
"Dream a Lie"
Side 2
"Tyler"
"Adella"
"Little By Little"
"The Earth Dies Screaming (12" Version)"

References

1982 compilation albums
UB40 compilation albums